Orazio Satta Puliga (October 6, 1910, in Torino – March 22, 1974, in Milan) was an Italian automobile designer known for several Alfa Romeo designs, of Sardinian ancestry.

He studied mechanical engineering (1933) and aeronautical engineering (1935) at the Politecnico di Torino  and joined the design department of Alfa Romeo (March 2, 1938), working under the direction of Wifredo Ricart. Satta followed Ricart as head of design (1946), overseeing the  158 and 159, Alfa Romeo 1900, Alfa Romeo Giulietta, Alfa Romeo Giulia, Alfa Romeo Montreal and Alfa Romeo Alfetta.  
He later became central director (1951) and finally general vice president (1969–73), before retiring due to Brain Cancer.

References 

Automotive engineers from Turin
Alfa Romeo people
1910 births
1974 deaths